Radoslav Rashkov (born 18 April 1987) is a Bulgarian footballer, who currently plays as a goalkeeper for Pavlikeni.

References

External links
 

1987 births
Living people
Bulgarian footballers
First Professional Football League (Bulgaria) players
PFC Svetkavitsa players
FC Etar 1924 Veliko Tarnovo players
FC Lyubimets players
FC Lokomotiv Gorna Oryahovitsa players
Association football goalkeepers